Tamiya is a town in Faiyum Governorate, Egypt.

Notable people
Sufi Abu Taleb

References 

Populated places in Faiyum Governorate
Cities in Egypt